The Women's Social and Political Union (WSPU) was a women-only political movement and leading militant organisation campaigning for women's suffrage in the United Kingdom from 1903 to 1918. Known from 1906 as the suffragettes, its membership and policies were tightly controlled by Emmeline Pankhurst and her daughters Christabel and Sylvia; Sylvia was eventually expelled.

The WSPU membership became known for civil disobedience and direct action. Emmeline Pankhurst described them as engaging in a "reign of terror". Group members heckled politicians, held demonstrations and marches, broke the law to force arrests, broke windows in prominent buildings, set fire to or introduced chemicals into postboxes thus injuring several postal workers, and committed a series of arsons that killed at least five people and injured at least 24. When imprisoned, the group's members engaged in hunger strikes and were subject to force-feeding. Emmeline Pankhurst said the group's goal was "to make England and every department of English life insecure and unsafe".

Early years
The Women's Social and Political Union (WSPU) was founded as an independent women's movement on 10 October 1903 at 62 Nelson Street, Manchester, home of the Pankhurst family. Emmeline Pankhurst, along with two of her daughters, Christabel and Sylvia, and her husband, Richard, before his death in 1898, had been active in the Independent Labour Party (ILP), founded in 1893 by former Scottish miner Keir Hardie, a family friend. (Hardie later founded the Labour Party.)

Emmeline Pankhurst had increasingly felt that the ILP was not there for women. On 9 October 1903, she invited a group of ILP women to meet at her home the next day, telling them: "Women, we must do the work ourselves. We must have an independent women's movement. Come to my house tomorrow and we will arrange it!" Membership of the WSPU was open to women only, and it had no party affiliation.

In 1905, the group convinced the Liberal MP Bamford Slack to introduce a women's suffrage bill; it was ultimately talked out, but the publicity spurred rapid expansion of the group. The WSPU changed tactics following the failure of the bill; they focused on attacking whichever political party was in government and refused to support any legislation which did not include enfranchisement for women. This translated into abandoning their initial commitment to also supporting immediate social reforms.

The term "suffragette" was first used in 1906 as a term of derision by the journalist Charles E. Hands in the London Daily Mail to describe activists in the movement for women's suffrage, in particular members of the WSPU. But the women he intended to ridicule embraced the term, saying "suffraGETtes" (hardening the 'g'), implying not only that they wanted the vote, but that they intended to 'get' it.

Also in 1906, the group began a series of demonstrations and lobbies of Parliament, leading to the arrest and imprisonment of growing numbers of their members. An attempt to achieve equal franchise gained national attention when an envoy of 300 women, representing over 125,000 suffragettes, argued for women's suffrage with the Prime Minister, Sir Henry Campbell-Bannerman. The Prime Minister agreed with their argument but "was obliged to do nothing at all about it" and so urged the women to "go on pestering" and to exercise "the virtue of patience".

Some of the women Campbell-Bannerman advised to be patient had been working for women's rights for as many as fifty years: his advice to "go on pestering" would prove quite unwise. His thoughtless words infuriated the protesters and "by those foolish words the militant movement became irrevocably established, and the stage of revolt began". In 1907, the organisation held the first of several of their "Women's Parliaments".

The Labour Party then voted to support universal suffrage. This split them from the WSPU, which had always accepted the property qualifications which already applied to women's participation in local elections. Under Christabel's direction, the group began to more explicitly organise exclusively among middle-class women, and stated their opposition to all political parties. This led a small group of prominent members to leave and form the Women's Freedom League.

Campaigning develops

Immediately following the WSPU/WFL split, in autumn 1907, Frederick and Emmeline Pethick Lawrence founded the WSPU's own newspaper, Votes for Women. The Pethick Lawrences, who were part of the leadership of the WSPU until 1912, edited the newspaper and supported it financially in the early years. Sylvia Pankhurst wrote a number of articles for the WSPU newspaper and, in 1911, published a piece on the history of the WSPU campaign. This included a detailed account of her experience during the Black Friday event in 1910. 

In 1908 the WSPU adopted purple, white, and green as its official colours. These colours were chosen by Emmeline Pethick Lawrence because "Purple...stands for the royal blood that flows in the veins of every suffragette...white stands for purity in private and public life...green is the colour of hope and the emblem of spring". June 1908 saw the first major public use of these colours when the WSPU held a 300,000-strong "Women's Sunday" rally in Hyde Park. Sylvia Pankhurst designed the logo and created a number of leaflets, banners, and posters.

In February 1907, the WSPU founded the Woman's Press, which oversaw publishing and propaganda for the organisation, and marketed a range of products from 1908 featuring the WSPU's name or colours. The woman's Press in London and WSPU chains throughout the UK operated stores selling WSPU products. A board game named Suffragetto was published circa 1908. Until January 1911, the WSPU's official anthem was "The Women's Marseillaise", a setting of words by Florence Macaulay to the tune of "La Marseillaise". In that month the anthem was changed to "The March of the Women", newly composed by Ethel Smyth with words by Cicely Hamilton.

On 13 October 1908, Emmeline Pankhurst together with Christabel Pankhurst and Flora Drummond organised a rush on the House of Commons. 60,000 people gathered in Parliament Square and attempts were made by suffragettes to break through the 5000 strong police cordon. Thirty-seven arrests were made, ten people were taken to hospital.  On 29 June 1909, WSPU activists Ada Wright and Sarah Carwin were arrested for breaking government windows. They were sentenced to a month in prison. After breaking every window in their cells, in a protest they went on a hunger strike, following the pioneering strike of Marion Wallace Dunlop. They were released after six days.

Direct action

In 1910 Conciliation Bill, giving a limited number of propertied and married women the vote was carried on its first reading in the House of Commons, but then shelved by Prime Minister Asquith. In protest, on 18 November Emmeline Pankhurst led 300 women from a pre-arranged meeting at the Caxton Hall in a march on Parliament where they were met and roughly handled by the police. Under continued pressure from the WSPU, the Liberal government re-introduced the Conciliation Bill the following year. Exasperated by the continued opposition and by the bill's limitations, on 21 November 1911, the WSPU carried out an "official" window smash along Whitehall and Fleet Street. Its target included the offices of the Daily Mail and the Daily News and the official residences or homes of leading Liberal politicians. 160 suffragettes were arrested. The Conciliation Bill was debated in March 1912, and was defeated by 14 votes.

The WSPU responded by organising a new and broader campaign of direct action. Once this got underway with the wholesale smashing of shop windows, the government ordered arrests of the leadership. Although they had disagreed with strategy, Frederick and Emmeline Pethwick-Lawrence, were sentenced to nine months imprisonment for conspiracy and successfully sued for the cost of the property damage.

Some WSPU militants, however, were prepared to go beyond outrages against property. On 18 July 1912, in Dublin Mary Leigh threw a hatchet that narrowly missed the head of the visiting prime minister H. H. Asquith. On 29 January 1913, several letter bombs were sent to the Chancellor of the Exchequer, David Lloyd George, and the prime minister Asquith, but they all exploded in post offices, post boxes or in mailbags while in transit across the country. Between February and March 1913, railway signal wires were purposely cut on lines across the country endangering train journeys.

On 19 February 1913, as part of a wider suffragette bombing and arson campaign, a bomb was set off in Pinfold Manor, the country home of the Chancellor of the Exchequer, Lloyd George, which brought down ceilings and cracked walls. On the evening of the incident Emmeline Pankhurst claimed responsibility, announcing at  a public meeting in Cardiff, we have “blown up the Chancellor of the Exchequer’s house”. Pankhurst was willing to be arrested for the incident saying “I have advised, I have incited, I have conspired”; and that if she was arrested for the incident she would prove that the “punishment unjustly imposed upon women who have no voice in making the laws cannot be carried out”. On 3 April Pankhurst was sentenced to three years’ penal servitude for procuring and inciting women to commit "malicious injuries to property".  The Temporary Discharge for Ill Health Bill was rushed through Parliament to ensure that Pankhurst, who had immediately gone on hunger strike, did not die in prison.

In response to the bomb Lloyd George wrote an article in Nash's Magazine, entitled “Votes for Women and Organised Lunacy” where he argued that the “main obstacle to women getting the vote is militancy”.  It had alienated those who would have supported them. The only way for women to get the vote is a new movement “absolutely divorced from stones and bombs and torches”.

On the last day of April, the WSPU offices were raided by the police, and a number of women were arrested and taken to Bow Street. They were Flora Drummond, Harriett Roberta Kerr, Agnes Lake, Rachel Barrett, Laura Geraldine Lennox and Beatrice Sanders. All were charged under the Malicious Damages Act of 1861, found guilty and received various sentences.

In the same month, April 1913, Dorothy Evans, posted as an organiser to the north of Ireland, was arrested in Belfast on explosive charges. Together with local activist Midge Muir, she created uproar in court demanding to know why the gun-running Ulster Unionist James Craig was not appearing on the same charges.

In June 1913 Emily Davison was killed while attempting to drape a suffragette banner on the King's horse as it was racing in the Epsom Derby—an incident famously captured on film.

On the evening of 9 March 1914 in Glasgow, about 40 militant suffragettes, including members of the Bodyguard team, brawled with several squads of police constables who were attempting to re-arrest Emmeline Pankhurst during a pro-suffrage rally at St. Andrew's Hall. The following day, suffragette Mary Richardson (known as one of the most militant activists, also called "Slasher" Richardson) walked into the National Gallery in London and attacked Diego Velázquez's painting, Rokeby Venus with a meat cleaver. Her action stimulated a wave of attacks on artworks that would continue for five months. In June, militants had placed a bomb beneath the Coronation Chair in Westminster Abbey.

Released following a hunger strike, in July 1914 Dorothy Evans was again arrested in Belfast. With a sister Hunger Strike Medalist, Lillian Metge, she was implicated in a series of arson attacks and the bombing of Lisburn Cathedral.

Hunger strikes 
In response to the continuing and repeated imprisonment of many of their members, the WSPU extended and supported prison hunger strikes. The authorities' policy of force feeding won the suffragettes public sympathy and induced the government later passed the Prisoners (Temporary Discharge for Ill Health) Act 1913. More commonly known as the "Cat and Mouse Act", this allowed the release of suffragettes, close to death due to malnourishment, and their re-arrest once health was restored. The WSPU fought back: their all-women security team known as the Bodyguard, trained in ju-jitsu by Edith Margaret Garrud and led by Gertrude Harding, protected temporarily released suffragettes from arrest and recommital. The WSPU also coordinated a campaign in which doctors such as Flora Murray and Elizabeth Gould Bell treated the imprisoned suffragettes.

A special medal, the Hunger Strike Medal, like a military honour was designed by Sylvia Pankhurst and awarded 'for Valour' to women who had been on hunger strike/force-fed.

Splits and currents 
Differences over direct action contributed to splits in the organisation. Emmeline Pethick Lawrence, who with her husband Frederick edited Votes for Women, was expelled in 1912. Christabel Pankhurst launched a new WPSU journal, fully committed to the militant strategy, The Suffragette. The Pethick-Lawrences then joined Agnes Harben and others in starting the United Suffragists, which was open to women and men, militants and non-militants alike.

Within the WPSU radical action was championed by the “Young Hot Bloods” or “YHB”. These were a group of  younger unmarried women formed by Annie Kenney’s sister Jessie and Adela Pankhurst in 1907. The group’s name derived from a newspaper comment: "Mrs Pankhurst will of course be followed blindly by a number of the younger and more hot-blooded members of the Union”. Members of the group included Irene Dallas, Grace Roe, Jessie Kenney, Elsie Howey, Vera Wentworth and Mary Home.

Sylvia Pankhurst and her East London Federation were expelled early in 1914. They had argued for an explicitly socialist organisation, aligned with the Independent Labour Party, and focused on working-class collective action rather than individual attacks on property. They renamed themselves the East London Federation of Suffragettes (ELFS) and launched a newspaper, the Women's Dreadnought.

During the First World War
On the outbreak of the First World War in 1914, Christabel Pankhurst was living in Paris, in order to run the organisation without fear of arrest. Her autocratic control enabled her, over the objections of Kitty Marion and others, to declare soon after war broke out that the WSPU should abandon its campaigns in favour of a nationalistic stance, supporting the British government in the war. The WSPU stopped publishing The Suffragette, and in April 1915 it launched a new journal, Britannia. While the majority of WSPU members supported the war, a small number formed the Suffragettes of the Women's Social Political Union (SWSPU) and the Independent Women's Social and Political Union (IWSPU), led by Charlotte Marsh, and including Edith Rigby and Dorothy Evans.

The WSPU faded from public attention and was dissolved in 1917, with Christabel and Emmeline Pankhurst founding the Women's Party.

Suffrage drama 
Between 1905 and 1914 suffrage drama and theatre forums became increasingly utilised by the women's movement. Around this same time, however, the WSPU also became increasingly associated with militancy, moving from marches, demonstrations, and other public performances to more avant-garde and inflammatory “acts of violence.” The organisation began using these shock tactics to demonstrate the seriousness and urgency of the cause. Their demonstrations included “window smashing, museum-painting slashing, arson, fuse box bombing, and telegraph line cutting,”—suffrage playwrights, in turn, began using their work to combat the negative press around the movement and attempted to demonstrate in performance how these acts of violence only occur as a last resort. They attempted to transform the negative, yet popular perspective of these militant acts as being the actions of irrational, hysterical, ‘overly-emotional’ women and instead demonstrate how these protests were merely the only logical response to being denied a basic fundamental right.

Suffragettes not only used theatre to their advantage, but they also employed the use of comedy. The Women's Social and Political Union was one of the first organisations to capitalise on comedic satirical writing and use it to outwit their opposition. It not only helped them diffuse hostility towards their organisation, but also helped them gain an audience. This use of satire allowed them to express their ideas and  frustrations as well as combat gender prejudices in a safer way. Suffrage speakers, who often held open-air meetings in order to reach a wider audience, had to face hostile audiences and learn how to deal with interruptions. The most successful speakers, therefore, had to acquire a quick wit and learn to "always to get the best of a joke, and to join in the laughter with the audience even if the joke was against" them. Suffragette Annie Kenney recalls an elderly man continuously jeering “if you were my wife I’d give you poison" throughout the course of her speech, to which she replied "yes, and if I were your wife I’d take it," diffusing threats and making her antagonist appear laughable.

Notable members

 Mary Ann Aldham
 Janie Allan
 Doreen Allen  
 Helen Archdale
 Ethel Ayres Purdie
 Barbara Ayrton
 Edith Marian Begbie
 Rosa May Billinghurst
 Teresa Billington-Greig
 Violet Bland
 Bettina Borrmann Wells
 Elsie Bowerman
 Janet Boyd
 Constance Bryer
 Lady Constance Bulwer-Lytton
 Evaline Hilda Burkitt
 Lucy Burns
 Sarah Carwin
 Eileen Mary Casey
 Joan Cather
 Una Duval
 Georgina Fanny Cheffins
 Helen Millar Craggs
 Ellen Crocker
 Helen Cruickshank
 Louie Cullen
 Alice Davies
 Emily Davison
 Charlotte Despard
 Violet Mary Doudney
 Edith Downing
 Flora Drummond
 Sophia Duleep Singh
 Elsie Duval
 Una Duval
 Norah Elam
 Dorothy Evans
 Kate Williams Evans
 Theresa Garnett
 Louisa Garrett Anderson
 Edith Margaret Garrud
 Katharine Gatty 
 Mary Gawthorpe
 Katie Edith Gliddon
 Nellie Hall
 Cicely Hamilton
 Beatrice Harraden
 Alice Hawkins
 Edith How-Martyn
 Elsie Howey
 Ellen Isabel Jones
 Annie Kenney
 Edith Key
 Aeta Adelaide Lamb
 Mary Leigh
 Lilian Lenton
 Constance Lytton
 Mary Macarthur
 Florence Macfarlane
 Margaret Macfarlane
 Margaret McPhun
 Frances McPhun
 Margaret Mackworth, 2nd Viscountess Rhondda
 Christabel Marshall
 Kitty Marion
 Dora Marsden
 Lillian Metge
 Dora Montefiore
 Alice Morrissey
 Flora Murray
 Margaret Nevinson
 Edith New
 Adela Pankhurst
 Christabel Pankhurst
 Emmeline Pankhurst
 Sylvia Pankhurst
 Frances Parker
 Alice Paul
 Emmeline Pethick-Lawrence
 Ellen Pitfield
 Isabella Potbury
 Mary Richardson
 Edith Rigby
 Rona Robinson
 Mary Russell, Duchess of Bedford
 Bertha Ryland
 Amy Sanderson
 Arabella Scott
 Muriel Scott
 Genie Sheppard 
 Alice Maud Shipley
 Dame Ethel Mary Smyth
 Harriet Shaw Weaver
 Evelyn Sharp
 Hope Squire
 Janie Terrero 
 Dora Thewlis
 Catherine Tolson
 Helen Tolson
 Julia Varley
 Marion Wallace Dunlop
 Elsie and Mathilde Wolff Van Sandau
 Patricia Woodlock
 Gertrude Wilkinson
 Laura Annie Willson
 Laetitia Withall
 Olive Wharry
 Celia Wray
 Ada Wright
 Rose Emma Lamartine Yates

See also
Feminism in the United Kingdom
Suffragette bombing and arson campaign
List of suffragists and suffragettes
List of women's rights activists
List of women's rights organizations
Men's League for Women's Suffrage
Timeline of women's suffrage
Women's suffrage organizations
List of suffragette bombings

Sources

Notes

References

Bibliography

Further reading 
 Bartley, Paula. Emmeline Pankhurst (2002)
 Davis, Mary. Sylvia Pankhurst (Pluto Press, 1999) 
 Harrison, Shirley. Sylvia Pankhurst: A crusading life, 1882–1960 (Aurum Press, 2003)
 Holton, Sandra Stanley. "In sorrowful wrath: suffrage militancy and the romantic feminism of Emmeline Pankhurst." in Harold Smith, ed. British feminism in the twentieth century (1990) pp: 7–24.
 Loades, David, ed. Reader's guide to British history. (Fitzroy Dearborn Publishers, 2003). 2:999–1000, historiography
 Marcus, Jane. Suffrage and the Pankhursts (1987)
 Pankhurst, Emmeline. "My own story" 1914. London: Virago Limited, 1979. 
 Purvis, June. "Emmeline Pankhurst (1858–1928), Suffragette Leader and Single Parent in Edwardian Britain." Women's History Review  (2011) 20#1 pp: 87–108.
 Romero, Patricia W. E. Sylvia Pankhurst: Portrait of a radical (Yale U.P., 1987)
 Smith, Harold L. The British women's suffrage campaign, 1866–1928 (2nd ed. 2007)
 Winslow, Barbara. Sylvia Pankhurst: Sexual politics and political activism (1996)

External links
Annual Reports of the National Women's Social and Political Union, 1908–1912., LSE Digital Library, London School of Economics and Political Science.
Museum of London, Votes for Women exhibition and programming, 2 February 2018 – 6 January 2019.
Papers, 1911–1913.
Schlesinger Library, Radcliffe Institute, Harvard University.

 
1903 establishments in the United Kingdom
1918 disestablishments in the United Kingdom
Emmeline Pankhurst
Feminist organisations in the United Kingdom
First-wave feminism
Organisations based in Manchester
Organizations established in 1903
Organizations disestablished in 1918
Women's organisations based in the United Kingdom
Social history of the United Kingdom
Suffrage organisations in the United Kingdom
Terrorism in the United Kingdom